The 1998 PBA season was the 24th season of the Philippine Basketball Association (PBA).

Board of governors

Executive committee
 Emilio P. Bernardino, Jr. (Commissioner) 
 Bernabe L. Navarro, Jr. (Chairman, representing Ginebra San Miguel)
 Reynaldo G. Gamboa (Vice-Chairman, representing Formula Shell Zoommasters)
 Manuel M. Encarnado (Treasurer, representing Sta. Lucia Realtors)

Teams

Season highlights
The PBA is in their toughest challenge with the formation of a new league called Metropolitan Basketball Association, backed by the giant network ABS-CBN, and is perceived to be a threat to the 24-year existence of the PBA.  
The Alaska Milkmen won two titles during the year while Formula Shell ended a six-year title-drought by winning the final conference of the season.
For the third time in every four years, an All-pro squad to be known as Philippine Centennial Team will be given a task to win the basketball gold in the Asian Games, slated in December in Bangkok, Thailand. Alaska coach Tim Cone was chosen to handle to national team and pick the pro cagers to comprise the 12-man lineup. The Centennial team participated in the Jones Cup basketball tournament in Taipei and won their third championship.    
This is the only season that features four conferences with the addition of the Centennial Cup in celebration of the centennial anniversary of Philippine independence. The Philippine Centennial Team played as guest team in preparation for the 1998 Asian Games. The tournament was won by the Mobiline Phone Pals.
The two-import format was revived during the Centennial Cup and the Governor's Cup.

Opening ceremonies
The muses for the participating teams are as follows:

Champions
 All-Filipino Cup: Alaska Milkmen
 Commissioner's Cup: Alaska Milkmen
 Centennial Cup: Mobiline Phone Pals 
 Governor's Cup: Formula Shell Zoom Masters
 Team with best win–loss percentage: Alaska Milkmen (41–25, .621)
 Best Team of the Year: Alaska Milkmen (3rd)

All-Filipino Cup

Elimination round

Semifinal round

Third place playoff 

|}

Finals

|}
Finals MVP: Kenneth Duremdes (Alaska)
Best Player of the Conference: Nelson Asaytono (San Miguel)

Commissioner's Cup

Elimination round

Playoffs

Finals

|}
Finals MVP: Kenneth Duremdes (Alaska)
Best Player of the Conference: Kenneth Duremdes (Alaska)
Best Import of the Conference: Devin Davis (Alaska)

Centennial Cup

Elimination round

Playoffs

Governors' Cup

Elimination round

Semifinal round

Third place playoffs 

|}

Finals

|}
Finals MVP: Benjie Paras (Shell)
Best Player of the Conference: Jerry Codiñera (Purefoods)
Best Import of the Conference: Silas Mills (Mobiline)

Individual awards
 Most Valuable Player: Kenneth Duremdes (Alaska)
 Rookie of the Year:  Danny Ildefonso (San Miguel)
 Sportsmanship Award: Freddie Abuda (San Miguel)
 Most Improved Player: Patrick Roy Fran (Mobiline)
 Defensive Player of the Year: Chris Jackson (Formula Shell)
 Mythical Five
 Johnny Abarrientos (Alaska)
 Alvin Patrimonio (Purefoods)
 Jerry Codiñera (Purefoods)
 Jojo Lastimosa (Alaska)
 Kenneth Duremdes (Alaska)
 Mythical Second Team
 Rodericko "Olsen" Racela (San Miguel)
 Mike Mustre (San Miguel)
 Danny Ildefonso (San Miguel)
 Nelson Asaytono (San Miguel)
 Victor Pablo (Formula Shell)
 All Defensive Team
 Chris Jackson (Formula Shell)
 Freddie Abuda (San Miguel)
 Jerry Codiñera (Purefoods)
 Glenn Capacio (Mobiline)
 Patrick Fran (Mobiline)

Awards given by the PBA Press Corps
 Coach of the Year: Perry Ronquillo (Formula Shell)
 Mr. Quality Minutes: Rodney Santos (Alaska)
 Executive of the Year: Wilfred Uytengsu (Alaska)
 Comeback Player of the Year: Glenn Capacio (Mobiline)
 Referee of the Year: Franco Ilagan

Board of Governors
 Emilio Bernardino (Commissioner)
 Ruben Cleofe (Secretary)
 Bernabe Navarro (Chairman, La Tondeña Distillers, Inc)
 Reynaldo Gamboa (Vice-Chairman, Pilipinas Shell Petroleum Corp.)
 Manuel Encarnado (Treasurer, Sta. Lucia Realty and Development, Inc)
 Wilfred Steven Uytengsu (Alaska Milk Corp.)
 Luis Lorenzo, Jr (Lapanday Holdings Corp.)
 Nazario Avendaño (San Miguel Corp.)
 Joaquin Trillo (Alaska Milk Corp.)
 Teodoro Dimayuga (Purefoods Corp.)
 Elmer Yanga (Republic Flour Mills Corp.)
 Roberto Eduardo (La Tondeña Distillers, Inc)
 Eliezer Capacio (Purefoods Corp.)
 Ignatius Yenko (Lapanday Holdings Corp.)

Cumulative standings

References

 
PBA